A Bugged Out Mix is a double album by American DJ / producer Felix da Housecat, released in 2003.

Track listing

References

2003 albums
Felix da Housecat albums